Michael Sylvester may refer to:

 Mike Sylvester (born 1951), American basketball player
 Michael Sylvester (politician), American politician and labor organizer
 Michael Sylvester (tenor),  American operatic lyric-spinto tenor